George James Allan, also known as George J Allan or just George Allan, (born 1935) is an American philosopher and former Professor of Philosophy and Dean of the College at Dickinson College. He is also a former president of the Metaphysical Society of America (2000-2001).

Works
His body of works are:

The Importances of the Past: A Meditation on the Authority of Tradition(1985)

The Realizations of the Future :An Inquiry into the Authority of Praxis(1990)

The Patterns of the Present :Interpreting the Authority of Form(2001)

Higher Education in the Making Pragmatism, Whitehead, and the Canon(2004)

Comments on Ferré's "The Practicality of Metaphysics"(2005)

Modes of Learning: Whitehead's Metaphysics and the Stages of Education(2013)

Neville’s Ontological Ultimate: A Bridge Too Far(2015)

References

21st-century American philosophers
Philosophy academics
1935 births
Presidents of the Metaphysical Society of America
Dickinson College faculty
Living people
Yale University alumni
Grinnell College alumni